Manganese carbonate is a compound with the chemical formula MnCO3.  Manganese carbonate occurs naturally as the mineral rhodochrosite but it is typically produced industrially.  It is a pale pink, water-insoluble solid.  Approximately 20,000 metric tonnes were produced in 2005.

Structure and production
MnCO3 adopts a structure like calcite, consisting of manganese(II) ions in an octahedral coordination geometry.

Treatment of aqueous solutions of manganese(II) nitrate with ammonia and carbon dioxide leads to precipitation of this faintly pink solid.  The side product, ammonium nitrate is used as fertilizer.

Reactions and uses
The carbonate is insoluble in water but, like most carbonates, hydrolyses upon treatment with acids to give water-soluble salts.

Manganese carbonate decomposes with release of carbon dioxide, i.e. calcining, at 200 °C to give MnO1.88:
MnCO3 + 0.44 O2  →   MnO1.8  +  CO2
This method is sometimes employed in the production of manganese dioxide, which is used in dry-cell batteries and for ferrites.

Manganese carbonate is widely used as an additive to plant fertilizers to cure manganese deficient crops.  It is also used in health foods, in ceramics as a glaze colorant and flux, and in concrete stains.

It is used in medicine as a hematinic.

Toxicity 
Manganese poisoning, also known as manganism, may be caused by long-term exposure to manganese dust or fumes.

See also
Manganese deficiency (medicine)

References

Carbonates
Manganese(II) compounds